Syllepte butlerii is a moth in the family Crambidae. It was described by Hermann Dewitz in 1881. It is found in Angola, Cameroon, the Democratic Republic of the Congo (Katanga, East Kasai), Sierra Leone and Zambia.

References

Moths described in 1881
butlerii
Moths of Africa